Wailua, Hawaiian for two waters, may refer to:

Places

Hawaii, United States

Kauai
Wailua, Kauai, a town on the east coast
Wailuā Homesteads, Hawaii, a nearby town in the hills to the west
Wailua River, a river in eastern Kauai
Wailua Falls, a waterfall along the river
Wailua River State Park, a park along the river

Maui
Wailua, Maui County, Hawaii, a census-designated place on the north coast
Wailua Valley State Wayside Park, a nearby park

Indonesia
A city in Ambelau, Indonesia

Other
Hyposmocoma wailua, a moth endemic to Kaua'i

See also
 Waialua, Hawaii